The 1976–77 Connecticut Huskies men's basketball team represented the University of Connecticut in the 1976–77 collegiate men's basketball season. The Huskies completed the season with a 17–10 overall record. The Huskies were an NCAA Division I Independent school for men's basketball this year, after the Yankee Conference became a football only conference. The Huskies played their home games at Hugh S. Greer Field House in Storrs, Connecticut and the Hartford Civic Center in Hartford, Connecticut, and were led by eighth-year head coach Dee Rowe.

Schedule 

|-
!colspan=12 style=""| Regular season

|-
!colspan=12 style=""| ECAC tournament

Schedule Source:

References 

UConn Huskies men's basketball seasons
Connecticut
1976 in sports in Connecticut
1977 in sports in Connecticut